The Diocese of Truro (established 1876) is a Church of England diocese in the Province of Canterbury which covers Cornwall, the Isles of Scilly and a small part of Devon. The bishop's seat is at Truro Cathedral.

Geography and history

The diocese's area is that of the county of Cornwall, including the Isles of Scilly, as well as two parishes in neighbouring Devon (St Giles on the Heath and Virginstow). It was formed on 15 December 1876 from the Archdeaconry of Cornwall in the Diocese of Exeter. It is, therefore, one of the younger dioceses. The Christian faith, however, has been present in the region since at least the 4th century – more than 100 years before there was an Archbishop of Canterbury. Many of the communities in the diocese, as well as the parish churches, bear a Celtic saint's name, which is a reminder of the links with other Celtic lands, especially Ireland, Wales and Brittany.

The Diocese of Truro is involved directly and indirectly through its Board of Social Responsibility and in the life of its parishes in tackling some of the economic problems that Cornwall is wrestling with and works closely with statutory and voluntary agencies. There are 313 church buildings.

Bishops
The current diocesan bishop is Philip Mounstephen, since the confirmation on 20 November 2018 of his election. There is a suffragan Bishop of St Germans (which see was created in 1905) whose current bishop is Hugh Nelson); at some periods there have also been assistant bishops, including John Wellington (formerly Bishop of Shantung) and Bill Lash, both retired from sees abroad. The provincial episcopal visitor for parishes in the diocese, among twelve other dioceses in the western part of the Province of Canterbury, which do not accept the ministry of women priests, is the suffragan Bishop of Ebbsfleet. He is licensed as an honorary assistant bishop of the diocese in order to facilitate his ministry.

The most recent suffragan Bishop of Plymouth in the neighbouring Diocese of Exeter, John Ford, was also licensed as an honorary assistant bishop in Truro diocese. A former Bishop of St Germans, Roy Screech, lives in St Austell.

Archdeaconries and deaneries

Rural deaneries
The names of the older deaneries (before 1875) are based on those of the ancient Hundreds of Cornwall though the boundaries do not always correspond. East and West (Wivelshire) must have originally had a Cornish name but it is not recorded (Wivel may be from an Anglo-Saxon personal name 'Wifel').

The deaneries created in 1875 in the episcopate of Frederick Temple were Bodmin, Stratton, St Austell and Carnmarth. These remained unchanged until Carnmarth was divided; later still in the 1980s some alterations of boundaries occurred. The need for smaller deaneries was caused by the economic growth of Victorian Cornwall, mainly in tin and copper mining, which increased the population and by a greater effort by the church to encourage church membership.

Coat of arms

The arms of the diocese include a saltire gules on which are a crossed sword and key: below this is a fleur de lys sable, all surrounded by a border sable charged with 15 bezants. The saltire is the cross of St Patrick, taken to be the emblem of the Celtic church; the sword and key are emblems of Ss Peter and Paul, the patrons of Exeter Cathedral, and the fleur de lys represents St Mary, patron of the cathedral. The border is derived from the arms of the Duchy of Cornwall. They were designed by the College of Heralds in 1877 and are blazoned thus:
"Argent, on a saltire gules, a key, ward upward, in bend, surmounted by a sword, hilt upward, in bend sinister, both or. In base, a fleur de lys sable. The whole within a bordure sable, fifteen bezants. Ensigned with a mitre."

Future
In 2003 a campaign group was formed called Fry an Spyrys ("Free the Spirit" in Cornish) which is dedicated to disestablishing the Church of England in Cornwall and to reconstituting the Diocese of Truro as an autonomous province of the Anglican Communion. Its most vociferous member is the founder, the Revd Andy Phillips, who also writes under the pen-name "An Bucca". Its chairman is Garry Tregidga of the Institute of Cornish Studies. Phillips states there has been constant speculation that the diocese might be merged back into the Diocese of Exeter for budgetary reasons.

The possibility of a merger was aired unofficially in March 2003, during debate surrounding the formulation of the Dioceses, Pastoral and Mission Measure, which would allow diocesan commissions to make proposals for the reorganisation of dioceses, including their dissolution. However, such a merger has yet to be proposed by any official body within the Church of England. When the possibility was raised by Fry an Spyrys in 2004 it was denied by a Church of England spokesman and also by representatives of the Truro and Exeter dioceses Since then the Diocese of Truro has shown some financial and administrative resilience. Diocesan reorganisation and the People of God campaign rallied human resources and led (by 2007) to a tight but stable financial situation. More recently Lord Lloyd of Berwick, who chairs Parliament's Ecclesiastical Committee, reported to the House of Lords that there are no plans to abolish the Diocese of Truro and to merge it with the Diocese of Exeter.

Jeremy Dowling review
A 2018 case review commissioned by the diocese reported that four bishops, Maurice Key, Peter Mumford, Michael Ball and Richard Llewellin, had failed to respond to disclosures of abuse by a leading diocesan figure. The diocese had failed to investigate the accusations against Jeremy Dowling, a lay preacher and synod member, who rose to influential positions including communications officer to the bishop. Dowling was jailed in 2015 for seven years, and again in 2016 for a further eight years, for a series of indecent assaults on boys while teaching at a Cornish school during the 1960s and 70s. Kim Stevenson, a criminal justice expert, said the report made "sadly familiar reading" and she contrasted the situation in Britain with that in Australia where those who concealed or did not act on evidence of a sexual offence faced prosecution.

List of churches in the diocese
Grade I: buildings of exceptional interest.
Grade II*: particularly important buildings of more than special interest.
Grade II: buildings that are of special interest, warranting every effort to preserve them.

Last fully updated 26 September 2018.

Deanery of Stratton

Deanery of Trigg Major

Deanery of Trigg Minor & Bodmin

Deanery of East Wivelshire

Deanery of West Wivelshire

Deanery of Carnmarth North

Deanery of Carnmarth South

Deanery of Kerrier

Deanery of Penwith 

1also licensed as curates in each other's parishes

Deanery of Powder

Deanery of Pydar

Deanery of St Austell

See also

Truro Cathedral School

References

Further reading
Donaldson, Aug. B. (1902) The Bishopric of Truro: the first twenty-five years, 1877–1902. London: Rivingtons (online version)

Books by Charles Henderson
The Cornish Church Guide Truro: Blackford, 1925 (only in part by Henderson)  
Contents:- Part I: Historical. Celtic kalendar; History of the ancient bishopric in Cornwall(*); Additional notes on the ancient bishopric; List of bishops, from AD 931 to the present time; The restoration of the Cornish bishopric(*); Parochial history: notes on all the parishes; Particulars of the formation of new ecclesiastical parishes; The architecture of the Cornish parish church (*); Cornish church plate(*); The Celtic crosses of Cornwall; The holy wells of Cornwall(*). Part II: Administrative(*). Sections marked (*) are not by Henderson. 
The Cornish Church Guide and Parochial History of Cornwall. Truro: D. Bradford Barton, 1964 (a reissue of "Parochial History of Cornwall", the author's principal contribution to The Cornish Church Guide published in 1925) 
The Ecclesiastical History of Western Cornwall. 2 vols. Truro: Royal Institution of Cornwall; D. Bradford Barton, 1962

External links
Diocesan website
Church of England Statistics 2002 

 
Christianity in Cornwall
Christianity in Devon
Dioceses established in the 19th century
Truro
Truro